Graham Buist (born 23 July 1936) is a New Zealand cricketer. He played in eight first-class matches for Central Districts from 1956 to 1958.

See also
 List of Central Districts representative cricketers

References

External links
 

1936 births
Living people
New Zealand cricketers
Central Districts cricketers
Cricketers from Napier, New Zealand